Shaheber Chithi is an 2022 show which premiered on Bengali general entertainment channel Star Jalsha from 27 June 2022. The show has been produced by Acropoliis Entertainment. It stars Pratik Sen and Debchandrima Singha Roy in the lead roles, alongside  Devlina Kumar, Oindrila Bose, Madhupriya Chowdhury in supporting roles.

Plot 
Saheb is a famous singer and an icon of Bengal, while Chithi, a sweet girl full of life is a postmaster. Chithi delivers letters, even though the world has become electronic, and the use of emails have risen considerably. Saheb loses his leg after an accident and decides to avoid the eyes of the public forever. Destiny is what brings these two souls face to face, and simple-hearted Chithi promises him to help him lead a normal life. Slowly they fall into love with each other.

Cast

Main 
 Pratik Sen as Shaheb Mukherjee – a famous singer and icon of Bengal, footballer, hero, Chithi's husband (2022 – present)
 Debchandrima Singha Roy as Chithi Mukherjee (née Sanyal) – Shaheb's wife,  a postwoman and peon (2022 – present)
 Devlina Kumar as Raima Chatterjee – an actress, Shaheb's rival, a greedy girl. (Main antagonist) (2022 – present)
 Vivaan Ghosh as Ankush Roy Chowdhury - Shaheb's younger cousin brother and rival, Mithila,s estranged son. (Main Antagonist) (2022 - present)

Recurring 
 Saheb's family

Oindrila Bose as Sara Sanyal (née Mukherjee) – Shaheb's sister, Bunty's wife, Abhi's fake ex-wife (2022 – present)
Sagnik Chatterjee as Arijit Mukherjee – Shaheb's father (Former Antagonist) (2022 – present)
Mallika Banerjee as Bidipta Mukherjee – Shaheb's mother (2022 – present)
 Chandicharan as Shaheb's paternal grandfather (2022 – present)
 Suchanda Chowdhury as Shucha  Mukherjee - Shaheb's paternal grandmother (2022 – present)

 Dipanjan Jack Bhattacharya as Indrajit Mukherjee – Saheb's uncle (2022 – present)
 Rajasree Bhowmick as Rupanjana Mukherjee –  Indrajit's wife, Saheb's aunt (2022 – present)
 Moumita Chakraborty as Swarno- saheb's younger  grandmother, always wait for her husband's letter  (2022 – present)
 Tanuka Chatterjee as Mithila Mukherjee – Shaheb's aunt (2022 – present)
 Ananya Sengupta as Parna  Mukherjee -saheb's aunt(2022–present)

 Sreetama Roy Chowdhury as Sritama – Shaheb's cousin sister (2022 – present)
 Indranil Mallick as Abhi – Shaheb's friend, Bhumi's husband, Sara's fake ex-husband (2022 – present)
 Arunava Dey as Mihir Mukherjee – Saheb's cousin brother (2022 – present)
 Piyali Sasmal as Sukriti Mukherjee – Mihir's wife (2022 – present)
Pritam Das as  Sunny Mukherjee - Saheb's cousin brother
Chithi's family
 Sanjib Sarkar as  Subimal sanyal- former post master, Chithi, Bhumi and Bunty's  father (2022 – present)
 Subhadra Mukherjee as Kaberi Sanyal (née Chakraborty) – Chithi, Bhumi and Bunty's mother (2022 – present)
Madhupriya Chowdhury as Bhumi Sanyal – Chithi's sister, Abhi's wife (2022 – present)
Ritwick Purakait as Bunty Sanyal – Chithi's brother (2022 – present)

References

External links 
Shaheber Chithi on Disney+ Hotstar

Bengali-language television programming in India
2022 Indian television series debuts
Indian drama television series
Indian romance television series
Star Jalsha original programming